is a Japanese manga series written and illustrated by Ryū Mizunagi. It was serialized in Kodansha's seinen manga magazine Good! Afternoon from March 2010 to February 2022, with its chapters collected into seventeen tankōbon volumes. An anime television series adaptation by J.C.Staff aired in Japan from January to March 2014.

Plot
Honoka Takamiya is a seemingly ordinary high school student who is living a normal life. However, his main problem in life is the constant presence of Ayaka Kagari, the beautiful idol and 'princess' of the school. As Honoka sits next to Ayaka in class and takes part in the same class cleaning duties as she does, even the tiniest interaction between them leads to Honoka getting beaten up by her fanclub.

One day, however, while Honoka is taking out the trash, a school building is mysteriously flung towards him. Luckily, a Witch swings to his rescue and wards off the attack. This Witch is revealed to be none other than Ayaka herself, who has been observing and protecting him ever since.

Characters

Main characters

Honoka is a second year student in high school. At first he often wonders about the frequent coincidences that happen to him. One day, he is attacked by a group called the Tower Witches who had been covertly making attempts on him. However, the attack is thwarted by Ayaka who turns out to be a Workshop Witch and has been protecting Honoka for quite some time. No longer having to hide her mission, Ayaka decides to become friendlier with him, much to the chagrin of a majority of his classmates. He has a high regard for her and a feeling that there is some sort of special connection between them as well as history, but can't remember anything past vague feelings.
Shortly after Ayaka reveals her secrets, Honoka asks to be taken as her apprentice so he can help support her. One of the main reasons Honoka has been targeted is due to a mysterious, eldritch entity inside him called Evermillion, aka the White Princess. This being can manifest into a physical form and can also give Honoka enormous amounts of magical power, though Ayaka forbids him from doing so (as Evermillion will demand some form of 'payment' from him.) Through some kind of spell, Ayaka is able to draw upon that power making her practically powerful, but any damage that Honoka takes gets transferred directly to her instead.
It is later revealed that due to an incident involving his mother and Kazane, Honoka inherited Kazane's blood, so was taken under her wing as her student. During his first encounter with Ayaka, the original host of Evermillion, he made a deal with the White Princess to save Ayaka's life, transferring the Witch's self into him, who was inadvertently purified due to Honoka's immense power and pure heart. The deal also connected Ayaka's life to himself, explaining her ability to harness the White Princess' power, as well as her innate devotion to Honoka. He and Ayaka were subsequently erased of all his memories in order to protect him and the secret, before eventually regaining them.

The school idol and the chairwoman's daughter, Ayaka is a beautiful, intelligent, and statuesque girl, standing over a head taller than Honoka. However she is extremely stoic and has a low social IQ, rarely changing her facial expression. She is Honoka's classmate, and the official "Princess" of the entire school, with authority over everybody in the school except for the chairwoman. Unknown to many she is a  who is capable of manipulating and controlling fire. There is a powerful spell between herself and Honoka, where she can't be killed, can literally ignore wounds such as being impaled by multiple blades, and receives an inexhaustible, enormous power as long as Honoka is nearby. However, powerful attacks like Medusa's petrification can still affect her if Honoka's belief in her falters, and any direct damage that Honoka receives is instantly transferred to her. Even without magic she is a formidable fighter physically, due to her mother's harsh training. Her mission is to protect Honoka from the tower witches, but she extends this mission to anyone she perceives as harassing or bullying him.
She is later revealed to have been the original host of Evermillion, locked away and forced through many experiments by her birth mother, Kayou Kagari. She was rescued by Honoka, who then made a deal with Evermillion, transferring her essence into him and granting him the power to save her life, thus making him her Master. She ended up forgetting everything about Kayou and was adopted by Kazane, who became the new head of the Kagari family to protect her.

Workshop Witches

Honoka's little sister, who also happens to be a Workshop Witch, has a teddy bear familiar that can transform into a gigantic combat mech she named  or Macaroon (depending on the translator). She also has an extreme brother complex with Honoka, their mother recounting how she jumps into his bed or tries to take baths with him every two days despite them both being teenagers. As such, she's extremely jealous of Ayaka and often gets into fights with her, especially when she finds her and Honoka in very suggestive situations. At some point she became a Workshop Witch with the task of protecting her brother when Ayaka wasn't around. Since her master is Rinon she is a strong hand to hand fighter as well. For some reason she can only bring out her full magic by using bears given to her by Honoka as mediums, which is why Macaroon is occasionally seen running errands in the background.

Ayaka's surrogate mother, head of the Workshop Witches in the city, and the chairwoman of Tōgetsu High School who has been alive as far back as the Crusades. Kazane has earned multiple nicknames over her lifetime, including "Dragon Tooth", "Torturer", and most infamously, "Bad End".
In sharp contrast to her daughter, Kazane is a short-tempered, violent, chain-smoking woman with little tolerance for issues. While somewhat intelligent, she tends to handle things with raw power rather than thinking them through resulting in wild misunderstandings and missing important details. As head of the local Workshop, Kazane possesses magic so powerful that ensures when anything gets destroyed by magic, any people nearby will survive un-harmed, though large enough magic damage to a large part of the city can drain her reserves.
Kazane has been acquainted with Honoka's family for years, having attended high school with Komachi Takamiya, Honoka and Kasumi's mother. During her high school years she was a violent delinquent, frequently being suspended. The first time she and Komachi met was after Kazane beat up her entire class for bullying Komachi. They became close friends afterwards, even getting into a romantic relationship. However, since they couldn't get married, they decided to marry Honoka and Ayaka off to each other.
It is eventually revealed that Komachi had gotten into a near fatal accident, and Kazane saved her life by using some of her blood, despite her not being allowed to do something like that. This had the unintended consequence of her first born, Honoka, to inherit Kazane's blood, leading her to take the boy under her wing as her student in order to keep a watch on him. After the encounter with Kayou Kagari, and Honoka's deal with Evermillion, Kazane captured Kayou and used her, as well as herself joining the Workshop, in order to bargain for Honoka and Ayaka's lives, also becoming the head of the Kagari family to watch over her.

A chemistry teacher at Honoka's high school who helps manage the memories of the non-witch population whenever parts of the city get destroyed by magic. He also recruits witches throughout the city for the Workshop. Mikage has his own plans for Honoka and his "white stuff", but his true motives are unknown.

A Workshop Witch who specializes in ice-based magic that can increase in proportion to a perceived threat, even bringing a sweeping cold front over the entire city if she finds herself in mortal danger. Touko was a childhood friend of Ayaka, being asked by Kazane herself (along with Houzuki, Ayaka's fanclub leader) to watch over her as Ayaka had almost no social intelligence to speak of, and continues watching her into the present. Touko works part-time at several different jobs around the city to help support her family of 12 siblings, including maid cafe waitress to bartender, which conveniently allows her to provide important information to Ayaka when necessary. Until Ayaka took over the position she was the Student Council's Vice President, and is now the "Vice-Vice President".

A Workshop Witch and Kasumi's teacher in the Workshop hierarchy, who also runs a gang of delinquents that dress up in hamster-themed costumes. Nicknamed "Bear Killer" after allegedly choking a tiger (named "Bear-eye") to death with her bare hands. Publicly challenged Honoka for control of the school's Student Council until she was defeated. Honoka almost beat her himself, but refused to land the final blow when he had a chance so Ayaka and the Ivory Quintet finished her off. Unlike other witches, Rinon doesn't use visible magic at all, preferring to instead use it to enhance her immense physical strength. In the anime, it is implied that she underwent Kazane's harsh training alongside Ayaka.

A soft-spoken witch with cat-like ears who wields a large sword. Atori prefers to talk through a small, magical ventriloquist doll she keeps nearby at almost all times. Has a questionable understanding of first-aid.

Tower Witches

Ivory Quintet

One of the Tower Witches who transferred to the same school where Honoka and Ayaka are studying. She is the unofficial head of the "Ivory Quintet" (a.k.a. "Furry-eared Gang", or KMM-dan in Japanese), a group of witches who were given the task to transfer to Tōgetsu High School and capture Honoka Takamiya.
According to the author, Tanpopo's last name was originally written to be "Crisis", but felt that would be too foreign in context, so instead she localized the name as Kuraishi. This became a running joke in the story, where Honoka constantly forgets how to pronounce her last name.

She is a member of Ivory Quintet; in spite of her natural mad-looking face, she actually has normal emotions. Her power is to summon and use demons by the book called  that she carries on her back, though this power is rarely shown.

A soft-voiced member of Ivory Quintet, who wields a scythe. She has a power called , which can only be used to revive dead skeletons of any size and use them as her weapons.

A member of the Ivory Quintet and Tōgetsu High School's Kendo club. Her given name is based on a same-named Japanese sword that she wields.

One of the Tower Witches that form the Ivory Quintet. She has the ability to pass through walls and create a defensive barrier. She wears a complete wolf pelt called "Coast Fenrir", a sort of baby wolf formed from the feather of a fallen angel that functions as both extra appendage and semi-sentient weapon.

Others

Her appearance changes depending on the soul of the individual she is within. Sometime in the past she was subjugated by Kayou Kagari and forced into the body of her daughter, Ayaka, in hopes of finding the perfect vessel to best control her powers. She manipulated Honoka into making a deal with him, planning to consume his soul, however instead becomes neutralized by Honoka's immense power (courtesy of Kazane's blood), and purified by his pure heart, being presented as a gorgeously, frilly white princess. This intrigues herself to want to stick around and sincerely help Honoka out, as well as playfully teasing him. Due to the deal Honoka made with Evermillion to save Ayaka, that is why she is capable of tapping into the White Princess' power.

A powerful Tower Witch who specializes in crafting potions and often walks around with a well-dressed crocodile familiar named Sebastian. Has her own plans for Honoka's "white stuff". Chronoire is on relatively neutral terms with Kazane despite officially being her enemy; sometimes Kazane physically beats and tortures her for information, other times Kazane entrusts her as temporary chairman of the school while she's on other business. Chronoire also has earned the nickname "Dead End" for her ability to turn into a part-crocodile monster and literally eat other witches if she wants.

A high-ranking Tower Witch who controls the KMM Gang and their associates in order to steal Honoka's "white stuff" for herself. Has the power to petrify her enemies into stone statues, but has been weakened after being trapped in a magic prison.

A Tower Witch whose main strength is meticulous planning and preparation as opposed to any overtly magic power. Though Weekend is not her real name, she uses it anyway for the notoriety it brings her. Weekend's specialty involves setting up explosives of both magic and non-magic varieties. Runs her own small faction to kidnap Honoka for his "white stuff" as well.

Honoka and Kasumi's mother. Rather a cheerful and supportive mother, she was easily broken emotionally. She fell in love with Kazane during her school years, and promised to marry her (instead, they arranged the marriage of their future children). She works as an office lady. She also has open arms, which was evident in the fact that she took the Ivory Quintet into her home.

Media

Manga
Witchcraft Works, written and illustrated by Ryū Mizunagi, was serialized in Kodansha's seinen manga magazine Good! Afternoon from March 5, 2010, to February 7, 2022. Kodansha collected its chapters in seventeen tankōbon volumes, released from November 5, 2010, to March 7, 2022.

The manga is licensed in North America for English language publication by Vertical. The first volume was released on October 21, 2014.

Following the series' conclusion, an "extra" serialization spin-off started on Good! Afternoon on March 7, 2022.

Volume list

Anime
An anime television series adaptation was announced in November 2012. It was animated by J.C.Staff and written and directed by Tsutomu Mizushima. The series' first episode was screened at Tokyo's Cinemart Shinjuku theater on December 29, 2013, streamed to 2000 people on December 30, 2013, by Bandai Channel and aired for twelve episodes between January 5 and March 23, 2014 on Tokyo MX. Additionally the anime was aired on TVA, AT-X, BS11, and ABC and was streamed with English subtitles by Crunchyroll. The series' music is composed by Technoboys Pulcraft Green-Fund.

Reception
The fourth volume of the manga series ranked #25 in the Oricon charts in November 2012 with a total of 27,389 copies sold in under a week. The fifth volume ranked #28 in the Oricon charts in May 2013 with a total of 31,678 copies sold in under a week. The sixth volume ranked #29 in the Oricon charts in November 2013 with a total of 27,573 copies sold in under a week.

References

External links
  
  
 

Anime series based on manga
J.C.Staff
Kodansha manga
Romantic comedy anime and manga
Seinen manga
Supernatural anime and manga
Television series about witchcraft
Vertical (publisher) titles
Witchcraft in anime and manga
Witchcraft in written fiction